GraphPad Software Inc. was a privately held software development corporation until its acquisition by Insight Partners in 2017.   The company was named Insightful Science, which itself merged with Dotmatics in 2021. The original software was written by Harvey Motulsky in 1989 and it was co-founded by Motulsky and Earl Beutler.  The company operates in California. Its products include the 2D scientific graphing, biostatistics, curve fitting software GraphPad Prism and the free, web-based statistical calculation software, GraphPad QuickCalcs.

GraphPad Prism 

GraphPad Prism is a commercial scientific 2D graphing and statistics software for Windows and Mac OS desktop computers. Software features include nonlinear regression, with functionalities including the removal of outliers, comparisons of models, comparisons of curves, and interpolation of standard curves. The software allows the automatic updating of results and graphs, and has functionality for displaying error bars.

References

Software companies based in California
Companies based in San Diego
Defunct software companies of the United States